International Hip Swing is a compilation CD released by the label K Records in 1993. It is centered on the alternative rock, indie pop and twee pop genres.

International Hip Swing gathered together a selection of recordings previously released in the series of vinyl 7-inch EPs entitled International Pop Underground.

Track listing
The album contains the following twenty songs:
 Shadowy Men on a Shadowy Planet – "Rusty and Rover"
 Melody Dog – "Tomorrow's World"
 Some Velvet Sidewalk – "Apple"
 Thee Headcoats – "Shouldn't Happen To A Dog"
 Lois – "Long Time Gone" (The Everly Brothers cover)
 Gravel – "Yesterday"
 Brief Weeds – "(It's So Hard Not To) Say Hello"
 Tiger Trap – "Hiding"
 Snuff – "Den Den"
 Mecca Normal – "Man Thinks 'Woman'"
 Girl Trouble – "Tarantula"
 Heavenly – "Escort Crash On Marsten Street"
 Unrest – "Yes She Is My Skinhead Girl"
 Duck Hunt – "Vacation"
 Teenage Fanclub – "Free Again" (Alex Chilton cover)
 Cannanes – "No One"
 Seaweed – "Deer Trap"
 Beat Happening – "Look Around"
 Fifth Column – "All Women Are Bitches"
 The McTells – "Clean"

See also 
International Pop Underground Convention

References

External links
 International Hip Swing Review
International Hip Swing page at K Records

1994 compilation albums
Alternative rock compilation albums
Indie rock compilation albums
K Records compilation albums